Tenaha High School is a public high school located in Tenaha, Texas (USA) and classified as a 2A school by the UIL. It is part of the Tenaha Independent School District located in north central Shelby County. In 2013, the school was rated "Met Standard" by the Texas Education Agency.

Athletics
The Tenaha Tigers compete in these sports - 

Baseball
Basketball
Cross Country
Football
Tennis
Track and field

State Titles
Boys Basketball - 
2003(1A/D1)
Football - 
1998(1A), 2011(1A/D2)
Marching Band 
2021(2A)

State Finalists
Football - 
1996(1A), 2012(1A/D2), 2017(2A/D2)

References

External links
Tenaha ISD

Public high schools in Texas
Education in Shelby County, Texas